Arpad Vaš (born 31 July 1989) is a Slovenian footballer who plays as a midfielder for Rudar Mursko Središće in Croatia.

Career statistics

Source: NZS (league games only)

References

External links
NZS profile 

1989 births
Living people
People from Lendava
Slovenian people of Hungarian descent
Slovenian footballers
Slovenian expatriate footballers
Slovenia youth international footballers
Association football midfielders
NK Nafta Lendava players
ND Mura 05 players
NK Aluminij players
NK Zavrč players
NŠ Mura players
Slovenian PrvaLiga players
Slovenian Second League players
Second Football League (Croatia) players
Slovenian expatriate sportspeople in Croatia
Expatriate footballers in Croatia